Damien Leake (born August 12, 1952, in The Bronx, New York City) is an American actor and record-holding masters track and field athlete.

Starting with a role in 1973's Serpico, Leake has had a continuous career appearing in some 70 motion pictures, plus numerous television and stage acting roles. Through the 1980s he was typecast as a "a tender, sensitive . . . half-crazed killer" including roles in Death Wish and Apocalypse Now.

Leake has branched out to other jobs related to the entertainment industry. He claims to having been a singer, dancer, director, musician, composer, musical director, vocal arranger, playwright, stage fight choreographer and ventriloquist.

On August 28, 1963, just days after his eleventh birthday, Leake joined his parents attending the March on Washington for Jobs and Freedom, where Martin Luther King Jr. delivered his "I Have a Dream" speech. When King was assassinated less than five years later, Leake began what has become a form of silent protest by remaining seated during the U.S. national anthem. The protest almost caused him to be tried in court-martial when he was in the Army, stationed at Fort Dix. In 2016, a similar protest by Colin Kaepernick caught mass media attention and the ire of then President Trump.

Leake is a top sprinter in masters athletics. On June 16, 2018, he set the American M65 record in the 100 meters, 12.31 +1.3 seconds, in Grass Valley, California.

Leake was a cousin of NFL defensive tackle Roger Brown.

References

External links

Living people
1952 births
American male actors
Masters athletes
U.S. national anthem protests (2016–present)